Hypothenar hammer syndrome (HHS) is a vascular occlusion in humans in the region of the ulna. It is caused by repetitive trauma to the hand or wrist (such as that caused by the use of a hammer) by the vulnerable portion of the ulnar artery as it passes over the hamate bone, which may result in thrombosis, irregularity or aneurysm formation. HHS is a potentially curable cause of Raynaud's syndrome, distinct from hand–arm vibration syndrome.

Cause

Diagnosis
A physical examination of the hand may show discoloration (blanching, mottling, and/ or cyanosis; gangrene  may be present in advanced cases), unusual tenderness/ a callous over the hypothenar eminence, and fingertip ulcerations and splinter hemorrhages over ulnar digits; if an aneurysm is present, there may also be a pulsatile mass.  Allen's test will be positive if an occlusion is present and negative if an aneurysm is present.  An angiogram may show a "corkscrew" ulnar artery or an occlusion or aneurysm at the hook of the hamate.

Treatment
Noninvasive treatments have an 80% success rate; Example: switch jobs, stop smoking, regular finger exercise, surgical options exist for other instances.

Epidemiology
HHS, though rare, occurs much more frequently in men than in women (9:1) and principally affects those in their 40s and 50s.

References

Vascular diseases
Overuse injuries